Archbishop Franz Xaver Luschin (3 December 1781 – 2 May 1854) was a Roman Catholic prelate who served as a Diocesan Bishop of Trento from 24 May 1824 until 23 June 1834, a Metropolitan Archbishop of the Roman Catholic Archdiocese of Lviv  and Primate of Galicia and Lodomeria from 23 June 1834 until 6 April 1835 and a Metropolitan Archbishop of Roman Catholic Archdiocese of Gorizia and Gradisca from 6 April 1835 his death on 2 May 1854.

Life
Archbishop Luschin was born in the wealthy peasant family of Carinthian Slovenes in Tainach (present day a part of town Völkermarkt). After graduation from gymnasium and lyceum education, he joined the Major Roman Catholic Theological Seminary in Klagenfurt and was ordained as priest on 26 August 1804, for the Roman Catholic Diocese of Gurk, after he had completed his philosophical and theological studies.

After his ordination, he served as an assistant priest in Klagenfurt from 1804 until 1808 and continued his studies in the University of Vienna earning a Doctor of Sacred Theology degree in 1813. He became a professor in a University of Graz and in 1815–1816, for one year, become a Rector. In 1820 he was appointed a referent in ecclesiastical affairs for the Tyrolean government in Innsbruck.

On 24 May 1824 he was confirmed by the Pope Leo XII as a Diocesan Bishop of Roman Catholic Diocese of Trento, that had been vacant for six years. On 3 October 1824 he was consecrated as a bishop by Metropolitan Archbishop Augustin Johann Joseph Gruber without co-consecrators. Here he worked not only on the solution of an ecclesiastical questions but also on economic problems.

On 23 June 1834 he was confirmed by the Holy See as a Metropolitan Archbishop of the Roman Catholic Archdiocese of Lviv and the second Primate of Galicia and Lodomeria in present-day Ukraine, but he immediately realized that he would not be able to control the difficult situation, as there were strong tensions between the Latin-rite Catholics and the united Ruthenians. So he immediately asked to be transferred to another see, and a year later, on 6 April 1835, he was confirmed by the Holy See as a Metropolitan Archbishop of the vacant Roman Catholic Archdiocese of Gorizia and Gradisca.

Archbishop Luschin died while in office on 2 May 1854 in Gorizia, Princely County of Gorizia and Gradisca, and was buried in the crypt of the local metropolitan chapel.

References

1781 births
1854 deaths
Carinthian Slovenes
People from Völkermarkt District
Prince-Bishops of Trent
University of Vienna alumni
Academic staff of the University of Graz
Slovenian Roman Catholic archbishops
Austrian Roman Catholic bishops
Archbishops of Lviv
19th-century Italian Roman Catholic archbishops
Ukrainian Roman Catholic archbishops
Roman Catholic archbishops of Gorizia